Hydrillodes is a genus of litter moths of the family Erebidae first described by Achille Guenée in 1854. Its validity is somewhat disputed.

Description
Palpi long and sickle shaped. Second joint curved over the head and third joint long. Thorax and abdomen smoothly scaled. Forewings with rounded apex usually. The outer margin evenly curved with short cell. Veins 4 and stalked. Hardly a trace of the discocellulars found. Vein 6 from upper angle of cell and veins 7 to 10 stalked. Hindwings with short cell. Vein 3 and 4 stalked. Vein 5 from lower angle of cell and vein 6 and 7 stalked.

Species
Species of the genus include:

 Hydrillodes abavalis 
 Hydrillodes aroa 
 Hydrillodes aviculalis 
 Hydrillodes bryophiloides    junior synonym of Hydrillodes aviculalis
 Hydrillodes captiosalis 
 Hydrillodes carayoni 
 Hydrillodes chionaemoides 
 Hydrillodes comoroana 
 Hydrillodes contigua 
 Hydrillodes crispipalpus 
 Hydrillodes danum 
 Hydrillodes dimissalis 
 Hydrillodes discoidea 
 Hydrillodes erythusalis 
 Hydrillodes eucaula 
 Hydrillodes fuliginosa 
 Hydrillodes funestalis 
 Hydrillodes gravatalis 
 Hydrillodes grisea 
 Hydrillodes griseoides 
 Hydrillodes hemusalis 
 Hydrillodes incerta 
 Hydrillodes inversa 
 Hydrillodes janalis 
 Hydrillodes labi 
 Hydrillodes latifascialis 
 Hydrillodes lentalis 
 Hydrillodes lugens 
 Hydrillodes mediochracea 
 Hydrillodes meeki 
 Hydrillodes melanozona 
 Hydrillodes metisalis 
 Hydrillodes moloalis 
 Hydrillodes morosa 
 Hydrillodes murudensis 
 Hydrillodes nilgirialis 
 Hydrillodes norfolki 
 Hydrillodes nubeculalis 
 Hydrillodes obscurans 
 Hydrillodes pacifica 
 Hydrillodes pala 
 Hydrillodes perplexalis 
 Hydrillodes pertruncata 
 Hydrillodes plicalis 
 Hydrillodes plicaloides 
 Hydrillodes poiensis 
 Hydrillodes postpallida 
 Hydrillodes pseudmorosa 
 Hydrillodes pterota 
 Hydrillodes pyraustalis 
 Hydrillodes semiluna 
 Hydrillodes sigma 
 Hydrillodes subalbida 
 Hydrillodes subbasalis 
 Hydrillodes subtruncata 
 Hydrillodes surata 
 Hydrillodes telisai 
 Hydrillodes thomensis 
 Hydrillodes toresalis 
 Hydrillodes torsivena 
 Hydrillodes truncata 
 Hydrillodes uliginosalis 
 Hydrillodes vexillifera

Notes

References

afromoths "Hydrillodes

Herminiinae
Moth genera